The 1984–85 Norwegian 1. Divisjon season was the 46th season of ice hockey in Norway. Ten teams participated in the league, and Valerenga Ishockey won the championship.

First round

Second round

Playoffs

Kvalserien

External links 
 Norwegian Ice Hockey Federation

Nor
GET-ligaen seasons
1984 in Norwegian sport
1985 in Norwegian sport